Faxonius jonesi, the Sucarnoochee River Crayfish, is a species of crayfish in the family Cambaridae. The common name refers to the Sucarnoochee River, near where the original specimens were found in Kemper County, Mississippi. It is endemic to Mississippi and Alabama in the United States.

References

External Links 

Cambaridae
Endemic fauna of the United States
Freshwater crustaceans of North America
Crustaceans described in 1992
Taxa named by Joseph F. Fitzpatrick Jr.
Taxobox binomials not recognized by IUCN